Salisbury City Police was a British police force that existed officially between 1835 and 1943. It was absorbed by Wiltshire Constabulary during the Second World War.

History

Policing in Salisbury, previously known as New Sarum can be traced back to the 18th century when a local militia known as Brodie's Volunteers were instructed to watch over the city. They were overseen by the Salibsury Watch Commission who decided to disband the thirteen constables in 1836 in favour of forming a more official looking organisation. The new force called 'New Sarum Police' was to consist of one 'Superintending High Constable', one 'High Constable', four 'Day Constables' and ten 'Night Constables'. The City was one
mile 330 yards in length and 1500 yards in breadth.

In May 1836 the decision to dress the constables in a new uniform was made, it was to be similar to other forces with the letters 'NSP' (New Sarum Police) on the collar. Police stations were created on Endless Street and Salt Street.

In April 1838, New Sarum Police was disbanded and reorganised into Salisbury City Police, under the Municipal Corporation Act 1835. Mr John Bunter was the first Superintending Constable, earning £40 a year. More constables were hired in the reorganisation.

In 1839, the County Policing Act passed allowing counties to form police forces on top of city police forces, as a result Wiltshire Constabulary was formed in October 1839.

Due to World War II, Salisbury City Police decided to temporarily amalgamate with Wiltshire Constabulary, however towards the end of the war the separation of the two forces never happened due to the Defence (Amalgamation of Police Forces) Regulations of 1942 and Salisbury City Police ceased to exist after an official handover on 1 April 1943, when Wiltshire Constabulary took responsibility for policing Salisbury. The outgoing Chief Constable was made Assistant Chief Constable in Wiltshire Constabulary.

Chief Constables
Salisbury Museum now hold the original Hazelwood & Dent Badge & Button Dies  of the Salisbury City Police. Found in a load of scrap iron by Eugene Maidment in 1975 and donated to Salisbury Museum over thirty years later, to ensure they stayed in the City of Salisbury, rather than a private collection. 
 John Bunter (1838 - )
 Unknown
 Ernest Frank Richardson (1903–1929)
 R F Nixon (1929–1943)

See also
 Wiltshire Police
 Salisbury

References

1943 disestablishments in the United Kingdom
History of Salisbury
1838 establishments in the United Kingdom